Devita Saraf is the founder, chairman and CEO of the Vu Televisions.

Early life 
Saraf was born in Mumbai, India. Her father, Rajkumar Saraf, was chairman of Zenith Computers. She attended Queen Mary School, Mumbai. She later attended the H.R. College of Commerce and Economics and the University of Southern California, where she received a BA in business administration.

Career 
She founded the company at the age of 24 after completing her bachelor's degree in Business Administration from the University of Southern California. She has also studied management of technology at the University of California, Berkeley and game theory and strategic thinking at the London School of Economics. She is also pursuing the OPM program at Harvard Business School.

Zenith 
Saraf started her career at age 16, under the guidance of her father at Zenith Computers and was named as director of marketing when she was 21. In 2006 Saraf went from being the head of marketing to CEO.

Vu Technologies
At age 24, Saraf started Vu Technologies, which sells high-end LED TVs. While Zenith was mass technology focused, Vu sells innovative luxury items. Vu came out with a 4K HD Iconium Series televisions in October 2015. In October 2014, the Bombay High Court sealed the premises of the Andheri-based office of Vu Technologies after it fraudulently showed 200 employees in their affidavit but only 32 were found on premises in a visit and in the muster roll for September–October 2014.

Others
Saraf has been a National Co-Chair and Executive Committee Member in the Federation of Indian Chambers of Commerce and Industry (FICCI) Young Leaders Forum. She was also the founder and Chair of the Young Bombay Forum which was part of Bombay Chamber of Commerce and Industry. She is the member of Mensa, an international society for people with high IQ.

She was also a columnist for The Wall Street Journal. In 2017, Saraf bought a full page ad in the Times of India newspaper, where she congratulated Donald Trump on becoming President of the United States. The ad attracted mixed reviews on social media.

Controversy
The High Court of Bombay in a case filed by The Bank of New York Mellon, convicted her father, and the promoters of Zenith Infotech of siphoning company funds to personnel accounts and has directed the Board for Industrial and Financial Reconstruction Government of India (BIFR) to act in accordance with its regulations.

The Securities and Exchange Board of India (SEBI) accused Zenith Infotech Limited and its six promoters of fraudulent removal of funds to personnel accounts without notice to shareholders, and as of 25 March 2013, SEBI prevented the promoters from accessing the securities market or trading in securities in any manner. The named six promoters included by SEBI are Saraf; her father Rajkumar Saraf; Akash Kumar Saraf; Vijayrani Saraf; VU Technologies; and Zenith Technologies.

Books

Speaker

References 

Living people
Indian women chief executives
Marshall School of Business alumni
Indian emigrants to the United States
Indian chief executives
Mensans
Businesspeople from Mumbai
Businesswomen from Maharashtra
21st-century Indian businesswomen
21st-century Indian businesspeople
1981 births